Events in the year 1821 in Art.

Events
At the age of eleven, Théodore Chassériau is accepted into the studio of Ingres.
John Martin's paintings Joshua Commanding the Sun to Stand Still upon Gibeon and Belshazzar's Feast are purchased by his former employer William Collins and begin to tour.
Birmingham Society of Artists established in England.

Works

Edward Hodges Baily – Eve at the Fountain
Lorenzo Bartolini – The Campbell Sisters Dancing a Waltz (marble)
John Constable – The Hay Wain
William Etty – The Triumph of Cleopatra
Théodore Géricault – The 1821 Derby at Epsom
Charles Bird King – Young Omahaw, War Eagle, Little Missouri, and Pawnees
Bertel Thorvaldsen – Lion Monument, Lucerne
John Trumbull – Surrender of General Burgoyne

Births
January 27 – August Becker, German landscape painter (died 1887)
February 10 - Roberto Bompiani, Italian painter (died 1908)
February 26 – Félix Ziem, French painter (died 1911)
March 9 – Napoleon Sarony, Canadian American portrait photographer (died 1896)
April 16 – Ford Madox Brown, English painter (died 1893)
April 21 – Philip Henry Delamotte, English pioneer photographer (died 1889)
April 26 – Robert Adamson, Scottish pioneer photographer (died 1848)
June 18 – Théophile Schuler, French painter and illustrator (died  1878)
August 4 – Louis Vuitton, French fashion designer (died 1892)
August 28 – Thomas Seddon, English-born landscape painter (died 1856)
September 9 – James Smetham, English painter (died 1889)
October 13 – Évariste Vital Luminais, French historical painter (died 1896)
November 23 – Charles Meryon, French etcher (died 1868)
Robert S. Duncanson, African American landscape painter (died 1872)
 date unknown
Mario Raggi - Italian sculptor (died 1907)

Deaths
February 12 – Albertus Jonas Brandt, Dutch still-life painter (born 1788)
February 24 – Marie-Anne Collot, French sculptor (born 1748)
March 9 – Nicholas Pocock, English marine painter (born 1740)
April 18 – Thomas Baxter, English porcelain painter (born 1782)
April 22 – John Crome, English artist in the Romantic era (born 1768)
May 27 – Charles Alfred Stothard, English historical draughtsman (born 1786)
July 4 – Richard Cosway, English portrait painter (born 1742)
August 19 – Marie-Denise Villers, French painter specializing in portraits (born 1774)
August 21 – Adam Bartsch, Austrian scholar, artist, and printmaker in engraving and etching (born 1757)
September 10 – Johann Dominicus Fiorillo, German painter and art historian (born 1748)
 date unknown
 Luigi Agricola, Italian painter and jeweler (born 1750)
 Gaetano Stefano Bartolozzi,  Italian engraver, art dealer, and merchant (born 1757)
 Yi In-mun, Korean court painter of the late Joseon Dynasty, primarily of landscapes (born 1745)

References

External links

 
Years of the 19th century in art
1820s in art